Bartolotta is an Italian surname. Notable people with the surname include:

Angel Bartolotta (born 1981), American drummer
Camera Bartolotta (born 1963), American politician
Daniel Bartolotta (born 1955), Uruguayan footballer and manager
Jimmy Bartolotta (born 1986), American basketball player
Paul Bartolotta (born 1961), American chef and restaurateur
Steve Bartolotta (born 1963) 
American Composer and Musician

Italian-language surnames